Dame Margaret Kerslake Shields  (née Porter, 18 December 1941 – 29 May 2013) was a New Zealand politician of the Labour Party. She had three terms in the House of Representatives in the 1980s and was afterwards a member of the Greater Wellington Regional Council, including as chairman.

Early life
Shields was born on 18 December 1941 in Wellington, and was educated at Wellington Girls' College from 1955 to 1959. She campaigned for women's rights throughout her career. In 1966, she was one of a group of Wellington women (members of Newlands Playcentre) who founded the Society for Research on Women (SROW). She was a founding member of the Women's Electoral Lobby (WEL) in 1975 which aimed to get more women into parliament and public offices. She worked at the Department of Statistics from 1973 to 1981, and served on the Wellington Hospital Board from 1977 to 1980.

She was on the organising committee of the 1975 United Women's Convention, working alongside leading feminist organisers such as Sue Piper, Deidre Milne and Ros Noonan.

Political career

From the  she represented the  electorate in Parliament, but in the  she was defeated by Roger Sowry; one of a number of losses contributing to the fall of the Fourth Labour Government. In 1983 Shields was appointed as Labour's spokesperson for Science & Technology and Statistics by Labour leader David Lange. She was Minister of Customs and Consumer Affairs from 1984 and the Minister of Women's Affairs from 1987 to 1990.

Post-parliamentary career 
In 1990, she took up a position as director of INSTRAW, the United Nations International Research and Training Institute for the Advancement of Women, based in the Dominican Republic. She also held offices with the UN Development Fund for Women, the National Council of Women and the Federation of Graduate Women.

In 1995, Shields was elected to the Greater Wellington Regional Council. She became its deputy chairwoman in 1998, and was its first female chair from 2001 to 2004.

Honours
In 1993, Shields was awarded the New Zealand Suffrage Centennial Medal. In the 1996 Queen's Birthday Honours, she was appointed a Companion of the Queen's Service Order for public services, and later in the 2008 New Year Honours was appointed a Distinguished Companion of the New Zealand Order of Merit. In the 2009 Special Honours, Shields accepted redesignation as a Dame Companion, following the reintroduction of titular honours by the government.

Death
Shields died in Paraparaumu in 2013 and was survived by her husband Pat and one of her two daughters.

References

1941 births
2013 deaths
Dames Companion of the New Zealand Order of Merit
Members of the Cabinet of New Zealand
New Zealand Labour Party MPs
Women government ministers of New Zealand
Companions of the Queen's Service Order
People from Paraparaumu
People educated at Wellington Girls' College
Members of the New Zealand House of Representatives
New Zealand justices of the peace
New Zealand MPs for North Island electorates
Wellington Hospital Board members
Wellington regional councillors
Unsuccessful candidates in the 1990 New Zealand general election
Unsuccessful candidates in the 1975 New Zealand general election
Unsuccessful candidates in the 1978 New Zealand general election
Women members of the New Zealand House of Representatives
Recipients of the New Zealand Suffrage Centennial Medal 1993